Joséphine Berthault (20 November 1853 – 6 August 1923) was a French painter.

Life 
Joséphine was born in Angers, studied academic painting and drawing from a young age and was a student of her successful uncle, Jules Lenepveu. She married Fernand Berthault (1849 - 1930) who was also a painter.

Joséphine Berthault was active between 1877 and 1892, created mostly landscapes, portraits, and still lifes, and was one of a select group of women painters of the nineteenth century who exhibited their art throughout France. She also taught art to many students at her studio, located at Ralliement place in Angers, in the building built for her father-in-law Gaspard Berthault (1820 - 1900). Gaspard was a photographer and scenic painter who became known for his portraits in daguerreotypes.

Honors 
Distinctions awarded to Joséphine Berthault.

 Officer of the academy in 1899
 Honorable Mention at a Paris Salon in 1890
 Member, Society of French Artists
 Exposition Medals of Anger, Laval, and Tours.
 Showing "Portrait de mon oncle M. Jules Lenepveu" at the Museum of Beaux-Arts, Angers in 1892

Gallery

References

External links 

French women painters
19th-century French painters
20th-century French painters
20th-century French women artists
19th-century French women artists
1853 births
1923 deaths